The women's shot put event  at the 1982 European Athletics Indoor Championships was held on 6 March.

Results

References

Shot put at the European Athletics Indoor Championships
Shot